"Wha Gwarn?" is a song by British record production duo Chase & Status, featuring vocals from Bonkaz. The song was released as a digital download on 20 November 2015 through MTA Records and Mercury Records. The song has peaked to number 146 on the UK Singles Chart. It is song the third song in their London Bars project, a series of singles released in collaboration with grime MCs throughout November 2015.

Music video
A music video to accompany the release of "Wha Gwarn?" was first released onto YouTube on 19 November 2015 at a total length of four minutes and fifty seconds.

Track listing

Chart performance

Weekly charts

Release history

References

2015 singles
2014 songs
Chase & Status songs
Songs written by Saul Milton
Songs written by Will Kennard
Mercury Records singles